Jundu Mountains is a mountain range north of Beijing in China. Jundu Mountains represent the west part of the Yan Mountains. The Great Wall of China passes through Jundu Mountains with famous sections as Badaling.

References

Notes

Printed References

Mountain ranges of China
North China Plain
Landforms of Hebei
Landforms of Beijing